Banu al-Ash'ar (Ancient South Arabian: , ʾs²ʿrn) also known as al-Ashaira is a Qahtanite tribe that inhabited Yemen in the Arabian Peninsula. The companion of the prophet, Abu Musa al-Ash'ari is a member of this tribe.

History and origins 
The progenitor of Banu al-Ash'ar is Nabat ibn Udad who is also known as al-Ash'ar. The tribe's lineage is as follows: Nabat ibn Udad ibn Zayd ibn Yashjub ibn Arib ibn Zayd ibn Kahlan ibn Saba' ibn Yashjub ibn Ya'rub ibn Qahtan.

Nabat ibn Udad (Ash'ar) had seven sons: Al-Jamahir, al-Atgham, al-Argham, al-Adgham, Jedda, Abd Shams and Abd al-Thurayya.

Banu al-Ash'ar tribe was originally from Zabid in Yemen. After the Islamic Conquests under the Rashidun Caliphate (631-661), Many members of the Banu al-Ash'ar moved to settle in Bilad al-Sham. According to Ya'qubi who is writing in 892, the Banu Ash'ar were the majority around Tiberias. Records show that they were among the Arab tribes which settled in al-Andalus. The majority settled in the district of Rayya in Malaga, while some of them were also to be found in the city of Seville.

See also 
 Arabian tribes that interacted with Muhammad
 Al-Asha'ir Mosque
 Tribes of Arabia

References 

Tribes of Arabia